Kesikköprü Dam is a -tall earthen embankment dam on the Kızılırmak River  near Ankara, Turkey. The development was backed by the Turkish State Hydraulic Works. Construction on the dam began in 1959 and was finished in 1966. The dam irrigates an area of 6,600 hectares and has a maximum hydroelectricity production of 76 MW.

See also

List of dams and reservoirs in Turkey

External links
DSI directory, State Hydraulic Works (Turkey), Retrieved December 16, 2009

Dams in Ankara Province
Hydroelectric power stations in Turkey
Dams completed in 1966
Kızılırmak